Yan, sometimes known in historiography as Jie Yan, was a short-lived monarchical state in the vicinity of present-day Beijing at the beginning of the Five Dynasties and Ten Kingdoms period. Yan, established by Liu Shouguang in 911, only lasted for two years before its destruction by Li Cunxu of the Former Jin dynasty.

As the only ruler of Yan, Liu Shouguang was noted for his cruelty. The state of Yan was therefore sometimes referred to as Jie Yan, in reference to the tyrannical ruler Jie of the Xia dynasty.

References
 

 
Five Dynasties and Ten Kingdoms
Former countries in Chinese history
911 establishments
910s disestablishments
States and territories established in the 910s
States and territories disestablished in the 910s
10th-century establishments in China
10th-century disestablishments in China